Mohave or Mojave is the native language of the Mohave people along the Colorado River in northwestern Arizona, southeastern California, and southwestern Nevada. Approximately 70% of the speakers reside in Arizona, while approximately 30% reside in California. It belongs to the River branch of the Yuman language family, together with Quechan and Maricopa.

The Mojave language became endangered during the manifest destiny movement of the 19th century when Mohave and other Native American children were taken away from their parents and tribes to be placed in boarding schools, where they were prohibited from speaking their language. The schools went so far as to prohibit students from speaking their native tongue even with their parents when they occasionally visited home; many parents did not speak English.

History
At the turn of the 19th century the United States began expanding further west, and as it expanded settlers began encountering more Native Americans. Many of these interactions resulted in violence and death on both sides as the settlers viewed the indigenous people as nuisances to their expansion westward and the native people saw settlers as invaders. It is also at this time that the concept of unilinear evolution was prevalent within the social sciences and society in general, because of this native peoples were thought of as lesser beings or "Noble Savages" free from the burden of civilization yet encompassed by their baser instincts. As a means to lessen the altercation with the indigenous people of the west, the United States government began American Indian boarding schools. The purpose of these schools was to assimilate Native American children from the ages of 10 to 18 into European American culture, thus weakening their native culture and making them more compliant with the governments territorial expansion. This was accomplished by shearing their hair, replacing their native dress, teaching them English, Math, History, and giving them vocational skills. The Mojave tribe were no exception. In 1890 Fort Mojave was opened by the Thomas J. Morgan, The Commissioner of Indian Affairs, as an Indian school to serve children from the Mojave and Hualapai tribes. The school remained open until 1931 after the Meriam Report conclude off reservation Indian school a failure.

Phonology
All claims and examples in this section come from Munro (1974) unless otherwise noted. Mojave phonology is similar to that of Maricopa.

Consonants

The retroflex phonemes  and  only occur in very few words.

Vowels

Mohave has five vowel qualities, with length distinction and the weak vowel /ə/.

Audio example 
Hubert McCord, one of the four tribal leaders of the Mojave tribe, is fluent in the Mojave language. McCord has worked with poet Natalie Diaz, see revitalization below, documenting Mojave stories and songs. A video with audio of the language contains tribal elder McCord singing as he took some of the tribe's youth on a short voyage around the Colorado river.

Morphology 
The basic structure of a word in Mojave consists of a single vowel. Consonants can be added both prior to and following the vowel. Both derivational and inflectional morphemes are created by the addition of mostly prefixes, along with potential suffixes.

Tenses in Mojave are split up into present/past and future. The past and present tense are marked by the usage of -k, -m, and -pc^. The future tense is marked by the lack of any such marker.  First person subjects are expressed through the usage of ?- while n^j represents first person arguments. 2nd person subjects and arguments are denoted by m-  and 3rd is hallmarked by the lack of either of the two. Verbs are typically denoted via the addition of the suffixes -k and -m.

Syntax 
For the word order in the Mojave language, noun phrases containing the subject occur first with the verb occurring last in sentences with additional non-subject nouns, i.e. the object of a sentence, occurring between the subject and the verb. Also, the subject of a sentence is typically marked with the morpheme {-č}.Thereby, the Mojave language can be described as a subject-object-verb, SOV, language. Even with that SOV description, however, there are instances in which there aren't more than one or two specified, marked, or described noun phrases in a sentence because any noun phrase complement of a verb can be omitted as context determines. Moreover, word order is essential with utterances that contain a direct and an indirect object, in which both are unmarked by a morpheme. The basic form of such utterances is that the indirect object comes before the direct object. For example, here are tables in a three-line gloss of two sentences with captioned differences:

To negate in Mojave one would need to use one of the three apparent devices or methods. That is with the suffix -mot- which precedes a tense marker in lexical verbs, with the negative verb kava:r which is used on its own and literally means in English "to not", or with the suffix -poʔa:ve (the other variant is -poʔa:və) which is at times used with utterances that contain indefinite pronouns.

Revitalization

As of 2012, the Center for Indian Education at Arizona State University "has facilitated workshops for both learners and speakers at the Fort Mojave Indian Reservation in northwest Arizona, California and Nevada. Fort Mojave has about 22 elders who speak some Mojave." The project is also bringing elders together with younger people to teach the traditional Mojave "bird songs."

The language preservation work of poet Natalie Diaz on the reservation was featured on PBS NewsHour in March 2012.

See also
 Mohave traditional narratives

Notes

References

 Hinton, Leanne. 1994. Flutes of Fire: Essays on California Indian Languages. Heyday Books, Berkeley, California.

External links
 Mojave language overview at the Survey of California and Other Indian Languages
 OLAC resources in and about the Mohave language
 California Language Archive: "Mojave"
 World Atlas of Language Structures: Mojave
 Mojave basic lexicon at the Global Lexicostatistical Database
 Mohave Indian Language (Mojave)
 
 

Mohave tribe
Indigenous languages of Arizona
Indigenous languages of California
Indigenous languages of Nevada
Indigenous languages of the North American Southwest
Indigenous languages of the Southwestern United States
Yuman–Cochimí languages